Yevgeny Vladimirovich Krasnov (born 9 February 1998) is a Belarusian footballer, who plays for Vitebsk.

References

External links

1998 births
Living people
People from Mogilev
Sportspeople from Mogilev Region
Belarusian footballers
Association football forwards
FC Dnepr Mogilev players
FC Isloch Minsk Raion players
FC Vitebsk players